Bad Science Watch is a Canadian non-profit organization dedicated to improving consumer protection policies and promoting proper scientific inquiry, especially as it relates to health products and services marketed to the public.

Bad Science Watch intervenes both in the media and at the governmental level, advocating for stronger consumer protection against false scientific claims that could have an impact on the health of Canadians. The group's campaigns include raising awareness that homeopathic nosodes are not a proper replacement for vaccines, rules framing the marketing of natural health products and countering anti-wifi activism.

Its advisory council includes scientists such as Paul Offit, each specializing in an areas of interest.

References

Non-profit organizations based in Canada